Domenico Canevaro (Genoa, 5 August 1683Genoa, 15 February 1745) was the 156th Doge of the Republic of Genoa and king of Corsica.

Biography 
Canevaro was appointed with a considerable majority of votes in the election to the Doge's office of 20 February 1742, the one hundred and eleventh in biennial succession and the one hundred and fifty-sixth in republican history. As doge he was also invested with the related biennial office of king of Corsica. At his coronation in the Cathedral of San Lorenzo, on 7 July 1742, the ceremony was officiated by Monsignor Agostino Saluzzo, bishop of the Diocese of Mariana and Accia. At the end of the two-year period on 20 February 1744, the former doge retired to private life. Newly elected deputy for maritime affairs, he died in Genoa on 15 February 1745.

See also 
 Republic of Genoa
 Doge of Genoa

References 

18th-century Doges of Genoa
1683 births
1745 deaths